Atractus turikensis  is a species of snake in the family Colubridae. The species can be found in Colombia and Venezuela.

References 

Atractus
Reptiles of Colombia
Reptiles of Venezuela
Reptiles described in 2000